Danielle Harrison (born 15 November 1999) is a retired English figure skater. She won the British senior national title in December 2015.

Personal life 
Danielle Harrison was born on 15 November 1999 in Basingstoke, England. The daughter of Pam and Mark Harrison, she is the youngest of four children. She attended Castle Hill Junior School and later Everest Community Academy. She now attends Harris High School in Dundee.

Career

Early career 
Harrison began taking skating lessons in March 2006. In her early years, she was taught by Jenny Woolford at Basingstoke Arena. Harrison was awarded the novice bronze medal at the British Championships in the 2011–12 season and silver the following year, coached by Debi and Simon Briggs with support from Gary Peed, Peter Bækgaard, Andrew Smith and Lisa Beaumont. She won the British junior silver medal in the 2013–14 season.

2014–2015 season 
Harrison debuted on the ISU Junior Grand Prix (JGP) series at the start of the 2014–15 season, placing 15th in the Czech Republic and 14th in Estonia. In November 2014, she won the junior gold medal at the British Championships after placing first in the short program and third in the free skate. She also finished first at the Bavarian Open in February 2015, competing in Junior Ladies group I. Having attained the minimum technical scores, she was sent to the World Junior Championships in Tallinn, Estonia in March 2015. Her short program result, 27th, was insufficient to advance to the free skate.

2015–2016 season 
Harrison continued on the JGP series, finishing 20th in Poland and 17th in Spain. Making her senior international debut, she placed 7th at the Volvo Open Cup. In December, she became the British national senior champion, finishing just ahead of Zoe Wilkinson. At the 2016 European Championships in Bratislava, she placed 29th in the short program and did not advance to the free skate.

Programs

Competitive highlights 
CS: Challenger Series; JGP: Junior Grand Prix

References

External links

 
 

1999 births
British female single skaters
Living people
Sportspeople from Basingstoke